Victory for the Comic Muse is the ninth studio album by Irish chamber pop band the Divine Comedy, released in 2006 by EMI.

The title derives from the E.M. Forster book A Room with a View ("I have won a great victory for the comic muse"), as was the band's debut album Fanfare for the Comic Muse.

Recording
The album is unique in the Divine Comedy catalogue—and in the catalogue of most recent popular music—in that Hannon's original aim with the album was to record it entirely in two weeks, with the minimum of overdubbing. As such, almost all of the music on the album—much to the chagrin of the classical players involved on almost every track, and the Divine Comedy band itself—was recorded in live takes. At first, they attempted to use no click tracks or headphones, but this approach was eventually abandoned. The band would record their part, the orchestra would overdub theirs, and then Hannon would record his vocals. No further overdubbing took place unless absolutely necessary, in a fairly hurried style of recording, and in stark contrast to the modern recording technique of stacking up tracks.

During the recording, Hannon's vocals had to be recorded even more hurriedly than planned because for most of the two weeks he was suffering from a cold that got progressively worse before finally clearing up.

Release and reception
A special edition version of the album, officially available only on the first day of release, came with a bonus DVD and an additional cardboard sleeve.

On 28 February 2007, Victory for the Comic Muse won the Choice Music Prize at a ceremony that took place in Dublin's Vicar Street venue. The Choice Music Prize is Ireland's equivalent to the Mercury Music Prize. The judging panel was made up of 12 representatives from the Irish music industry. The prize consisted of a trophy as well as a cheque for €10,000. The Divine Comedy's victory was unexpected, as the album had received some lukewarm reviews and there was strong competition from the likes of The Immediate, Duke Special and Snow Patrol.

Track listing
All songs written by Neil Hannon except where noted.

 "Party Fears Two" was originally recorded by The Associates.

Personnel

Musicians

Neil Hannon – vocals, keyboards, acoustic guitar, electric guitar, banjo
Ian Watson – accordion
John Evans – acoustic guitar, electric guitar
Charlotte Glasson – baritone saxophone, tenor saxophone 
Chris Worsey – cello
Ian Burdge – cello
Chris Richards – clarinet
Tim Weller – drums
Dougie Payne – electric bass
Simon Little – electric bass, double bass
Eliza Marshall – flute
Matthew Gunner – French horn
Camilla Pay – harp
Celine Saout – harp
Andrew Skeet – piano, harpsichord
Ilid Jones – oboe, cor anglais
Rob Farrer – percussion
Mike Kearsey – trombone
Daniel Newell – trumpet
John Metcalfe – viola
Reiad Chibah – viola
Alison Dods – violin
Andrew Haveron – violin
Anna Kirkpatrick – violin
Calina De La Mare – violin
Gillon Cameron – violin
Lucy Wilkins – violin
Rick Koster – violin
Ruth Rogers – violin
Sonia Slany – violin

Technical personnel
Neil Hannon – producer, arranger
Andrew Skeet – musical director, additional arrangements
Laurence Aldridge – engineer
Mark Bishop – engineer
Raj Das – engineer
Richard Woodcraft – engineer
Steve Rooke – mastering
Tom Sheehan – photography
Adrian Green – stamp photography
Cally – art direction, design
Jason Long – design 
Nik Rose – design
Divine Management – management
Chris Worsey – Millennia Ensemble management
Jonathan Brigden – Millennia Ensemble management

Cultural references
"Arthur C. Clarke's Mysterious World" is a reference to the 80s television show of the same name.
The sample at the beginning of "To Die a Virgin" is of Jennifer Ehle and Toby Stephens in the 1992 TV series The Camomile Lawn.

References

2006 albums
Choice Music Prize-winning albums
The Divine Comedy (band) albums
Parlophone albums
Orchestral pop albums